This is a list of Canadian films which were released in 1984:

See also
 1984 in Canada
 1984 in Canadian television

1984
1984 in Canadian cinema
Canada